Castelsarrasin is a railway station in Castelsarrasin, Occitanie, France. The station is on the Bordeaux–Sète railway. The station is served by TER (local) services operated by SNCF.

Train services
The following services currently call at Castelsarrasin:
local service (TER Occitanie) Agen–Montauban–Toulouse

References

Railway stations in Tarn-et-Garonne